The St. Vitus Cathedral is a Roman Catholic cathedral in Rijeka, Croatia.

In the Middle Ages, the Church of St. Vitus was a small and one-sided, Romanesque church dedicated to the patron saint and protector of Rijeka. It had a semi-circular apse behind the altar, and covered porch. With the arrival of the Jesuits in Rijeka, the cathedral as we see it today was founded in 1638. First, it became the Jesuits' church. When the town of Rijeka became the center of the diocese, and then in 1969 the center of the archbishopric and metropolit, the representative Jesuit's Church of St. Vitus became the Cathedral of Rijeka. The structure is a rotunda, which is unusual in this part of Europe, with elements of Baroque and Gothic, including fine baroque statuary inside.

The cathedral was depicted on the reverse of the Croatian 100 kuna banknote, issued in 1993 and 2002.

Gallery

See also
 List of Jesuit sites

References

External links
Profile at Discover Baroque Art

Round churches
Cathedral
Roman Catholic churches completed in 1659
Roman Catholic cathedrals in Croatia
1659 establishments in Europe
17th-century establishments in Croatia
Cathedral
Culture in Rijeka
17th-century Roman Catholic church buildings in Croatia
Jesuit churches in Croatia